The seventeenth series of the British medical drama television series Holby City commenced airing in the United Kingdom on BBC One on 14 October 2014 and ran for 52 episodes, ending on 6 October 2015. The series saw the returns of Oliver Valentine (James Anderson), Henrik Hanssen (Guy Henry), and Essie Harrison (Kaye Wragg). Former series regular Hari Dhillon returned as Michael Spence for a six-episode guest arc. Former cast member Olga Fedori reprised her role as Frieda Petrenko for a guest appearance.

The series also saw several actors leave. Louise Delamere (Colette Sheward) made her exit in the fourth episode, later followed by Jules Knight (Harry Tressler) and Niamh McGrady (Mary-Claire Carter). Michael Thomson (Jonny Maconie) departed in episode 27, along with Rosie Marcel (Jac Naylor), who made a temporary departure to have her first child. Towards the end of September, the series saw the departure of one of the longest serving characters Elliot Hope (Paul Bradley).

Production
The series began airing on Tuesday nights on BBC One from 14 October 2014. Oliver Kent is the executive producer of the show, while Simon Harper serves as the series producer.

The series saw the return of Hari Dhillon as Michael Spence for six episodes, while Debbie Chazen was introduced as consultant Fleur Fanshawe for a three-month guest stint. Of her casting, Chazen commented, "I am thrilled to be joining Holby as the outrageous Fleur – she's going to be a lot of fun to play! I can't wait to stir things up on Keller Ward and am looking forward to being able to tell my family that I'm a doctor at last." Dhillon and Chazen made their appearances in the first episode of the series "'Not Waving But Drowning'". The second episode of the series saw a guest appearance from actress Wanda Ventham as Myrtle McKee, a patient who is treated by Dominic Copeland (David Ames). Myrtle is "an older lady of voracious appetites who leads a double life, meeting the needs of her husband before scurrying off to see her lover."

In October 2014, it was announced that Louise Delamere, who plays Colette Sheward, would be leaving the show. Delamere made the decision to leave "of her own accord" and Colette departed in the fourth episode on 4 November. The fourth episode also saw guest appearances from Antony Costa and Georgia Moffett, as Matthew Pendleton and Briony Whitman, following their debuts in Holby City's sister show Casualty on 1 November 2014. The fifth episode featured a storyline that helped commemorate the centenary of the beginning of World War I. Nina Toussaint-White also made her first appearance as Sophia Verlaine, an agency nurse and Fleur's love interest. Actress Anita Dobson guest starred as a terminally ill patient named Betty in the tenth episode. Betty played "a pivotal role" in Zosia March's (Camilla Arfwedson) ongoing mental health storyline.

This series saw the returns of Henrik Hanssen (Guy Henry), Oliver Valentine (James Anderson) and Essie Harrison (Kaye Wragg). Henrik and Oliver were last seen in 2013, while Essie appeared on a recurring basis in 2014. She became a regular cast member upon her return in episode 26. Henrik returns to the hospital after deciding that he wants to "bring his surgical brilliance back to Holby." Henry expressed his delight at reprising his role, saying "I'm so pleased to be reunited with Mr. Hanssen. He's such a weird and wonderful character to play - I've missed him! And the cast and crew at Holby are such fun to work with - I've missed them too." While Anderson was equally pleased to be back and said there would be "lots of surprises in store" for Oliver. Oliver made his full-time return on 5 May 2015.

The series' first standalone episode was broadcast on 6 January 2015, and focused on the Effanga sisters Mo (Chizzy Akudolu) and Adele (Petra Letang). They attended a family wedding, where a shared secret impacted on their futures. Actress Angela Wynter began her semi-regular role as Ina Effanga, the mother of Mo and Adele, during the standalone episode. The following month, it was announced that Nina Wadia had joined the cast as neurosurgeon Annabelle Cooper. Wadia will make her first of five appearances from 21 April (episode 28). February also saw Jules Knight (who plays Harry Tressler) confirm his departure. Knight left to concentrate on his music career. Harry and Mary-Claire Carter (Niamh McGrady) departed in the 27th episode "Go the Distance" on 14 April 2015. On 4 April 2015, it was announced that Michael Thomson (Jonny Maconie) had left Holby City. He departed in episode 27, along with Rosie Marcel (Jac Naylor), who made a temporary exit for maternity leave, although they both made a guest appearance in episode 37.

On 26 May 2015, it was announced former EastEnders actress Gillian Wright was to guest star as "troublesome" patient Lydia Rathbone during the episode broadcast on 2 June. New nurse Cara Martinez (Niamh Walsh) made her debut during episode 36 which was broadcast on 16 June. Two episodes later, Eleanor Fanyinka was introduced as new Foundation Year 1 doctor Morven Shreve. Towards the end of the series, during episode 50, Elliot Hope (played by Paul Bradley) departed the show after ten years. His exit was kept a secret to surprise viewers. The show's executive producer Oliver Kent commented, "We all adore Elliot Hope and we will miss him like crazy. Paul has been a fabulous member of the Holby City family for 10 years, and we thank him from the bottom of our hearts for all his incredible work."

Reception
The first episode of the series attracted an overnight audience of 4.64 million, with a 22.4% share in its time slot, making it the show's highest rating since 13 May 2014. This was surpassed in January 2015, when episode thirteen of the series attracted an overnight audience of 5.09 million, with a 23.4% share in its time slot, making it the show's highest figure since January 2014.

A Liverpool Daily Post journalist praised Catherine Russell (Serena Campbell) and Sandra Voe (Adrienne McKinnie) for their performances during Adrienne's dementia storyline, saying they had "put us all through the emotional wringer for months". Flynn Sarler from the Radio Times gave the thirteenth episode "Brand New You" a mixed review. Sarler thought that the issue of mental health was important, but the only emotion Guy and Zosia incited was boredom. While he liked the Effanga wedding storyline, branding it "much more fascinating". Sarler noted that the 26th episode "Squeeze the Pips" was "for those who want to see nurse Jonny Maconie finally get something he wants". He also found Guy's discomfort around Jonny "a joy to watch".

The show's production and editorial teams were nominated for the Achievement in Production accolade at the 2014 Creative Diversity Awards. Holby City was nominated for Best Drama at the 2015 Inside Soap Awards. The show also received a nomination in the Soaps and Continuing Series category at the Mind Media Awards for Zosia's bipolar storyline. The fiftieth episode, "At First I was Afraid" by Julia Gilbert earned a nomination in the Best Long Running TV Series category at the 2016 Writers' Guild of Great Britain Awards.

Episodes

Cast

Main characters 
Chizzy Akudolu as Mo Effanga

David Ames as Dominic Copeland
James Anderson as Oliver Valentine (episode 11, from episode 30)
Camilla Arfwedson as Zosia March
Bob Barrett as Sacha Levy
Paul Bradley as Elliot Hope (until episode 50)
Louise Delamere as Colette Sheward (until episode 4)
Eleanor Fanyinka as Morven Shreve (from episode 38)
Don Gilet as Jesse Law (from episode 3)
Guy Henry as Henrik Hanssen (from episode 29)
Jules Knight as Harry Tressler (until episode 27)
Petra Letang as Adele Effanga
Rosie Marcel as Jac Naylor (until episode 27, episodes 37 and 50)
Joe McFadden as Raf di Lucca
Niamh McGrady as Mary-Claire Carter (until episode 27)
John Michie as Guy Self
Rob Ostlere as Arthur Digby
Hugh Quarshie as Ric Griffin (episodes 11−32)
Catherine Russell as Serena Campbell
Michael Thomson as Jonny Maconie (until episode 27, episode 37)
Alex Walkinshaw as Adrian "Fletch" Fletcher
Niamh Walsh as Cara Martinez (from episode 36)
Kaye Wragg as Essie Harrison (from episode 26)

Recurring characters 
Macey Chipping as Evie Fletcher (from episode 15)
Geff Francis as Clifford George (episodes 29−47)
Hadley Fraser as Sebastian Coulter (episodes 36−49)
Ben Hull as Derwood "Mr T" Thompson
Wendy Kweh as Amy Teo (until episode 10)
Lisa Marged as Lucy Mottica (episodes 32−45)
Alan Morrissey as Kyle Greenham (until episode 12)
Carli Norris as Fran Reynolds (from episode 49)
Sandra Voe as Adrienne McKinnie (until episode 6)
Angela Wynter as Ina Effanga (episodes 13−52)

Guest characters 
Imogen Byron as Rachel Levy (episodes 14−19)
Debbie Chazen as Fleur Fanshawe (episodes 1−11)
McKell David as Lloyd Kramer (episodes 14−19)
Sally Dexter as Brigitte Nye (episodes 44−50)
Hari Dhillon as Michael Spence (episodes 1−6)
Olga Fedori as Frieda Petrenko (episode 50)
Calum Finlay as Aiden Kerrigan (episodes 14−19)
Jamie Glover as Angus Farrell (episodes 8, 29 and 34)
Jane Hazlegrove as Kathleen "Dixie" Dixon (episode 30)
Jody Latham as Jed Martinez (from episode 51)
Amy McCallum as Elinor Campbell (episode 3)
Amanda Mealing as Connie Beauchamp (episode 4)
Nina Toussaint-White as Sophia Verlaine (episodes 5−11)
Nina Wadia as Annabelle Cooper (episodes 28−32)

Notes

References
General

 Final viewing figures: 

Specific

External links
 Holby City series 17 at BBC Online
 Holby City series 17 at the Internet Movie Database

17
2014 British television seasons
2015 British television seasons